Magnus Fog (1 March 1893 – 19 June 1969) was a Danish equestrian. He competed in the individual dressage event at the 1928 Summer Olympics.

References

External links
 

1893 births
1969 deaths
Danish male equestrians
Olympic equestrians of Denmark
Equestrians at the 1928 Summer Olympics
People from Assens Municipality
Sportspeople from the Region of Southern Denmark